Belgium competed at the 1924 Summer Olympics in Paris, France. 172 competitors, 166 men and 6 women, took part in 82 events in 17 sports.

Medalists

Athletics

Seventeen athletes represented Belgium in 1924. It was the nation's fourth appearance in the sport.

Ranks given are within the heat.

Boxing 

Ten boxers represented Belgium at the 1924 Games. It was the nation's second appearance in the sport. Belgium won Olympic medals for the first time with two medals, including Jean Delarge's gold in the welterweight.

Cycling

Nine cyclists represented Belgium in 1924. It was the nation's fifth appearance in the sport as well as the Games.

The Belgians won both of the road cycling silver medals, with Hoevenaers leading the team and taking the individual medal. Three of the four road cyclists also competed in the team pursuit event on the track, winning bronze.

Road cycling

Ranks given are within the heat.

Track cycling

Ranks given are within the heat.

Diving

Two divers represented Belgium in 1924. It was the nation's third appearance in the sport, and the first time Belgium sent a woman in diving.

Ranks given are within the heat.

 Men

 Women

Equestrian

Eleven equestrians represented Belgium in 1924. It was the nation's fourth appearance in the sport; Belgium was one of three nations (along with France and the United States) to have competed in each Olympic equestrian competition to that point. Belgium finished without a medal for the first time; the best result was the jumping team (at fourth), while the top individual place was de Brabandère's sixth in the eventing.

Fencing

Nineteen fencers, all men, represented Belgium in 1924. It was the nation's fifth appearance in the sport as well as the Games. The four medals, including one gold, won by Belgian fencers put the country second on the sport's medal leaderboard for the year.

All four épéeists reached the twelve-man final, with Delporte winning the gold medal. The épée won silver, giving four-time Olympian Paul Anspach his fifth Olympic fencing medal 16 years after he won his first. Van Damme took bronze in the foil, as the team took silver, to give Belgium its first medals in foil fencing.

 Men

Ranks given are within the pool.

Football

Belgium competed in the Olympic football tournament for the third time, attempting to defend its 1920 gold medal. They were stunned in their first match, however, losing the second-round game to Sweden 8–1.

 Round 1 Bye

 Round 2

Final rank 9th place

Modern pentathlon

Four pentathletes represented Belgium in 1924. It was the nation's debut in the sport.

Rowing

15 rowers represented Belgium in 1924. It was the nation's fifth appearance in the sport as well as the Games, tying Canada and Great Britain for most rowing appearances.

Ranks given are within the heat.

Sailing

Eight sailors represented Belgium in 1924. It was the nation's third appearance in the sport. Huybrechts took the gold in the monotype dinghy.

Shooting

Fourteen sport shooters represented Belgium in 1924. It was the nation's fourth appearance in the sport.

Swimming

Ranks given are within the heat.

Tennis

 Men

 Women

 Mixed

Water polo

In its fifth Olympic water polo appearance, Belgium continued its streak of medal wins by claiming its fourth silver (and fifth overall) medal.

Roster
 Gérard Blitz
 Maurice Blitz
 Albert Durant
 Joseph de Combe
 Joseph Pletincx
 Joseph Cludts
 Georges Fleurix
 Paul Gailly
 Pierre Dewin
 Jules Thiry 
 Pierre Vermetten

First round
 Bye
Quarterfinals

Semifinals

Final

Silver medal semifinals

Silver medal final

Weightlifting

Wrestling

Freestyle wrestling

 Men's

Greco-Roman

 Men's

Art Competitions

References

External links
Official Olympic Reports
International Olympic Committee results database

Nations at the 1924 Summer Olympics
1924
Olympics